Traffic Safety, is a book authored by Leonard Evans, published in 2004 by the Science Serving Society of Bloomfield Hills, Michigan.

The book uses the methods of science to examine the deaths, injuries, and property damage from traffic crashes. It is more focused on public policy and countermeasures than the author's 1991 book Traffic Safety and the Driver. Results derived from many disciplines, including psychology, sociology, medicine, epidemiology, criminology, biomechanics, economics, physics, and engineering are synthesized into easily understood relationships.

Chapter headings
Traffic Safety is organized as follows:

 Introduction
 Data sources
 Overview of traffic fatalities
 Vehicle mass and size
 Environment, roadway, and vehicle
 Gender, age, and alcohol effects on survival
 Older drivers 
 Driver performance
 Driver behavior 
 Alcohol
 Occupant protection 
 Airbag benefits, airbag costs
 Measures to improve traffic safety
 How you can reduce your risk
 The dramatic failure of US safety policy
 Conclusions

See also
Traffic Safety and the Driver

References

Further reading

Automotive safety
Handbooks and manuals
2004 non-fiction books